WHBR-FM (103.1 MHz, "The Bear") is an active rock formatted broadcast radio station licensed to Parkersburg, West Virginia, serving the Mid-Ohio Valley.  WHBR-FM is owned and operated by Burbach Broadcasting Company.

External links
103.1 The Bear Online

HBR-FM